The Dharma Hall, also known as Lecture Hall, is an important building in Han Chinese Buddhist temples. The Dharma Hall is the place for senior monks to preach and generally ranks right after the Mahavira Hall.

With the similar architecture form with other halls, the Dharma Hall is more spacious. In the central back, there is a high platform with a sitting chair putting in the middle. In front of the chair is a table with a small sitting Buddha on it, behind the platform is a screen or a picture of lion which is also known as "Roaring lion" in Buddhism Dharma hung on the wall. Seats are placed on both sides of the platform with bells and drums for senior monks to beat when they are preaching. There are also seats on both sides of the monks' seats for laymen to listen to the Buddha Dharma by senior monks.

References

Further reading

External links

Chinese Buddhist architecture